Enigma is the second solo studio album by American rapper Keith Murray. It was released on November 26, 1996, via Jive Records. Recording sessions took place at Mirror Image Recordings in Long Island. Production was handled by Erick Sermon, who also served as executive producer, Ty Fyffe, The Ummah and Rod 'KP' Kirkpatrick. It features guest appearances from 50 Grand, Kel-Vicious, Erick Sermon, Busta Rhymes, Dave Hollister, Jamal and Redman. The album peaked at number thirty-nine on the Billboard 200 and number six on the Top R&B/Hip-Hop Albums chart in the United States.

Track listing

Charts

Weekly charts

Year-end charts

Singles

Personnel
Keith Murray – main artist
Gerald "50 Grand" Berlin – featured artist (tracks: 6, 11)
Kelly "Kel-Vicious" Brister – featured artist (tracks: 7, 11)
Erick Sermon – featured artist (track 10), backing vocals (tracks: 8, 12), producer (tracks: 2–5, 8, 9, 12, 13), co-producer (tracks: 7, 10, 11), executive producer
Jamal Phillips – featured artist (track 10)
Reginald "Redman" Noble – featured artist (track 10)
Trevor "Busta Rhymes" Smith Jr. – featured artist (track 10)
Dave Hollister – featured artist (track 12)
Evan "DJ EV" Hitch – scratches
The Ummah – producer (tracks: 6, 14)
Tyrone "Sugarless" Fyffe – producer (tracks: 7–10)
Rodrick Kirkpatrick – producer (track 11)
Troy Hightower – engineering, mixing
Rick St. Hillaire – engineering, mixing, remixing
Mike Hogan – engineering
Tim Donovan – engineering assistant
Mike Rew – engineering assistant
Tony Dawsey – mastering
Jackie Murphy – art direction, design
Russell Ward – cover image
Daniel Hastings – photography
Tanisha Jones – stylist

References

External links

1996 albums
Jive Records albums
Albums produced by J Dilla
Albums produced by Ty Fyffe
Keith Murray (rapper) albums
Albums produced by Erick Sermon